Richard Staples (Dick) Dodge (January 18, 1918 – May 24, 1974) was an American illustrator.

Early life
Born in Sacramento, California in 1918, Dick Dodge attended several colleges on scholarship, including the Art Center School, Chouinard School, and Mills College Summer Session where he studied with Lionel Feininger and Frederick Taubes. He transferred to Cincinnati Art Academy beginning October 1939, attending on an out-of-town full scholarship from the Arts Students League.

Dodge enlisted in the US Air Corps on October 27, 1942, serving at Patterson Air Field in Hamilton, Ohio for about 4 months before being honorably discharged due to health issues.

Career
Following his service, Dodge resumed studies at Cincinnati Art Academy in the 1943 school year. In August 1943 he accepted a position at Columbia Records in Bridgeport, Connecticut, where his friend James Flora had recently been hired by Alex Steinweiss. Recalling those early years at Columbia Records, Ginnie Hofmann recalled Flora saying, "Everything will be fine. Dick Dodge is here." According to several contemporary sources, Dodge was hired as Art Director when Flora was promoted to advertising executive. But he never served in that role (or served only briefly), as Robert M. Jones became Art Director after Flora.

Using his connections with Flora and Jones, who both later worked for RCA Victor (Jones as Art Director), Dodge contributed to the album (LP) catalog of both labels producing artwork for the covers and sleeves of material ranging from children's stories to popular song to classical music – for example, the original cast recording cover for Paint Your Wagon.

Dodge's commercial work also included periodicals, children's books, and dust jackets for dozens of titles published by Random House, Simon & Schuster, Harcourt Brace, and MacMillan. Notable examples of his children's book illustrations include Too Many Sisters and The First Book of Boys Cooking, both authored by Jerrold Beim. He illustrated several of the covers for P.G. Wodehouse books published by Simon & Schuster as well as Zorba the Greek by Nikos Kazantzakis.

Between 1954 and 1958, Dodge contributed illustrations to Ford Times magazine, including the cover illustration of the December 1955 edition (Vol. 47, No. 12), titled "Christmas Tree Highway".

Throughout his life, Dodge created artwork in many media and styles, with influences ranging from Regionalism to Abstract Expressionism. Dodge was an active member of the American Watercolor Society from 1956 until his death. According to his New York Times obituary, he was a charter member of the Artist Guild of Westport, Connecticut as well as being a member of the Illustrators Society of New York.

Selected Bibliography (Illustrator)
 1953 – Zorba the Greek 
 1954 – The Return of Jeeves 
 1955 – Bertie Wooster Sees It Through 
 1956 – The Butler Did It 
 1956 – Too Many Sisters 
 1957 – The First Book of Boys Cooking 
 1971 – Jeeves and the Tie That Binds

References

External links
 Treasury of Great Children's Books
 The Curiously Sinister Art of Jim Flora

1918 births
1974 deaths
Artists from California
Artists from Connecticut
Painters from New York City
American children's book illustrators
Deaths from colorectal cancer
20th-century American painters
American male painters
People from Sacramento, California
Art Academy of Cincinnati alumni
Deaths from cancer in New York (state)
United States Army Air Forces personnel of World War II
20th-century American male artists